Coordinates: 
St Nicholas Acons was a  parish church in the City of London. In existence by the late 11th century, it was destroyed during the Great Fire of London of 1666 and not rebuilt.

History
The church  was situated on the west side of Nicholas Lane in Langbourn ward of the City of London. The name 'Acons' was derived from that of a mediaeval benefactor. The church is recorded as early as 1084, when Godwinus and his wife Turund gave its patronage to Malmesbury Abbey. It passed to the Crown on the dissolution of the monasteries.

St Nicholas' was destroyed during the Great Fire of London of 1666 and not rebuilt. Instead the parish was united with that of St Edmund the King and Martyr, Lombard Street in 1670. The name retained as the name of a precinct  in the south-western part of  Langbourn Ward.

In the 1860s a proposed unification of the benefice of St Edmunds with  St Nicholas and that of St Mary Woolnoth with St Mary Woolchurch Haw  was vigorously defended by St Nicholas Acons' discrete churchwardens.  In 1964 the churchyard was excavated and important Saxon remains found, but in the last decade of the 20th century Gordon Huelin  noted that only a City Corporation commemoration  at the site of the old parsonage remained to indicate a church had ever been there.

Present day
The parish now forms part of the combined parish of "St Edmund the King and Martyr, and 
St Mary Woolnoth Lombard Street with St Nicholas Acons, All Hallows Lombard Street, St Benet Gracechurch, St Leonard Eastcheap, St Dionis Backchurch and St Mary Woolchurch Haw" – usually shortened to 'St Edmund and St Mary Woolnoth'. It is part of the Church of England's Diocese of London.

Notes and references

Bibliography
"The Register Book of the parish of St. Nicholas Acons, London, 1539–1812" Brigg, W(Transc) p 160: Leeds, Walker & Laycock, 1890.
Church of England, Parish of St. Nicholas Acons. – PLAN OF THE PARISH OF SAINT NICHOLAS ACON'S LOMBARD STREET 1875 / George Leg, 1875 ms. plan. – k1264830 cited in "City of London Parish Registers Guide 4" Hallows, A. (Ed): London, Guildhall Library Research, 1974  .
"Vanished churches of the City of London", Huelin, G p21 : London Guildhall Library Publishing, 1996 
A Descriptive Account of the Guildhall of the City of London-Its History and Associations in "The English Historical Review"  Price, J.E. pp. 154–158:  Oxford, Oxford University Press  Jan., 1888 (Vol. 3, No. 9)

The Proposed Union Of City Benefices in "The Times" p 10: London, The Times Newspaper, 1861 (Wednesday, 20 November; Issue 24095; col C)
Local Administrative Units: Southern England Youngs, F. p. 302 :London, Royal Historical Society, 1979
"The London Encyclopaedia" Hibbert, C; Weinreb, D; Keay, J: London, Pan  Macmillan, 1983 (rev 1993,2008)

External links

11th-century church buildings in England
1666 disestablishments in England
Churches destroyed in the Great Fire of London and not rebuilt
Churches in the City of London
Former buildings and structures in the City of London